Brian ‘Shorts’ Shortall is a former Laois minor Gaelic footballer and Australian rules footballer.

Playing career
Shortall is a native of  Durrow, County Laois and played his club football with The Harps GAA and represented Laois GAA at minor level and won a Leinster Minor Football Championship medal in 1998 before losing to a Tyrone team led by Cormac McAnallen in the All-Ireland Final. He played in all six games for the Ireland national Australian rules football team, that won the 2002 Australian Football International Cup.

References

Living people
Laois Gaelic footballers
Gaelic footballers who switched code
Irish players of Australian rules football
Year of birth missing (living people)